No Name Storm may refer to:

 1991 Perfect Storm, a nor'easter that transitioned into a tropical storm and ultimately strengthened into an unnamed hurricane off the Atlantic coast of the United States
 1993 Storm of the Century, an extratropical cyclonic storm that formed over the Gulf of Mexico then moved through the eastern United States before moving into eastern Canada